Eduardo Rivera is an Uruguayan association football coach who manages Club Libertad in the Primera División Paraguaya.

Career
Rivera coached for many years in Ciudad del Este and Presidente Franco, coaching Paranaense, Cerro Porteño PF and 3 de Febrero before moving to Sportivo Luqueño of the city of Luque, where he took the club to the semi-finals of the 2015 Copa Sudamericana.

On 11 December 2015, it was announced by D10 Paraguay that Rivera was the new coach of Club Libertad, over taking Ever Hugo Almeida.

References

1961 births
Uruguayan football managers
Living people
Sportivo Luqueño managers
Club Libertad managers